St. Andrew's Hospital (河间圣安得烈医院) is located in Beijing, China.  It was founded by the Anglican Church of China.

References

Hospitals in Beijing
Hospitals with year of establishment missing